Munus refers to either:

 Singular form of Latin munera, in ancient Rome, a duty or provision owed to a person or persons, living or dead
In particular, a gladiator game
 MUNUS, a Sumerian determinative indicating a female personal name